Justin Thomas Brunette (born October 7, 1975) is former Major League Baseball pitcher.

A single in his only at-bat left Brunette with a rare MLB career batting average of 1.000.

External links

1975 births
Living people
Baseball players from California
St. Louis Cardinals players
Major League Baseball pitchers
Arkansas Travelers players
Binghamton Mets players
Memphis Redbirds players
New Jersey Cardinals players
Norfolk Tides players
Peoria Chiefs players